C. Adam Harris (born October 14, 1975) is a former Republican member of the Pennsylvania House of Representatives for the 82nd District. He was elected in 2002 and served until 2018.

Career
After graduating from college, Harris joined the House Commerce and Economic Development Committee as a research analyst.  He ran for the House in 2002 with the retirement of Rep. Daniel Clark.  Harris won re-election to his Juniata County district every other year from 2004 to 2016.

Harris served as Chairman of the House Liquor Control Committee.

In 2018, Harris announced that he would not seek reelection.

Harris graduated from Susquehanna University in 1998 with a degree in political science.

References

External links

Representative Harris's official web site
Pennsylvania House profile

1975 births
Living people
Republican Party members of the Pennsylvania House of Representatives
People from Juniata County, Pennsylvania
Susquehanna University alumni
21st-century American politicians